Jef Van Gool (born 27 April 1935) was a Belgian football player who finished top scorer of the Belgian First Division with 25 goals (together with Jozef Vliers) in 1958 while playing for Antwerp.

References

1935 births
Living people
Belgian footballers
Royal Antwerp F.C. players
Belgian Pro League players
Association football forwards